Plextronics, Inc. was an international technology company that specialized in printed solar, lighting and other electronics. It filed for Chapter 11 bankruptcy in January 2014. Headquartered in Pittsburgh, Pennsylvania, the company's focus was on organic solar cell and organic light-emitting diode lighting, specifically the conductive inks and process technologies that enable those and other similar applications. It was an R&D spin-off from Carnegie Mellon University. based on technologies developed by Richard D. McCullough. 

Printed electronics comprise next-generation light, power and circuitry products, including flexible displays, plastic solar cells, organic field effect transistors and organic RFID tags. Plextronics' vision is to enable 15 billion printed electronic devices by 2015.

On August 21, 2008, Plextronics was honored by the Pittsburgh Business Times as one of the region's 100 fastest-growing companies, and the fastest-growing in the Manufacturing/Transportation category.

Funding 

In 2007, Plextronics completed a $20.6 million Series B financing, led by Solvay North America Investments, LLC, a member of the Solvay Group, an international chemical and pharmaceutical group headquartered in Brussels. Significant investments were also received from Applied Ventures, Firelake Capital Management, Birchmere Ventures, Draper Triangle Ventures and Newlin Investment Company.

In 2009, Plextronics has closed a $14 million Series B-1 financing round, which was led by Solvay North America Investments, LLC, a member of the Solvay Group. This marks Solvay’s second investment in Plextronics in three years, raising the Belgian chemical firm's stake to $12 million and making it the largest minority shareholder in the printed electronics materials development company.

In mid-2011, Solvay provided $15 million (EUR 10 million) in a Series B-2 financing round to the company. This financing will support the acceleration of Plextronics' technology development and delivery of its innovative products to a growing base of global customers. Solvay is Plextronics' largest minority shareholder.

Plextronics has raised a total of $41 million in equity capital since 2002.

Technology 

Printed electronics takes advantage of printing technology to manufacture electronic devices, including printed organic solar cells, radio-frequency identification tags and flexible displays. Plextronics creates materials that enable the commercialization and manufacturing scale of this emerging technology.

The company's Plexcore technology is solution-processable inks for printed electronics, either conductive, photoactive, or semi-conductive. The inks are tunable to provide customized solutions.

Plextronics focuses on polymer design and ink formulation, as well as device physics and analysis.

In 2009 the CEOs of Pittsburgh, PA-headquartered Plextronics, Westinghouse, Allegheny Energy, EQT, CONSOL Energy and BPL Global announced that they have founded the U.S. Center for Energy Leadership (USCEL). The mission of the group is to establish a stable energy environment for the U.S. that includes energy independence, stable energy pricing and a portfolio approach to meeting increasing energy needs. USCEL will also advocate for new and innovative technological developments that will impact all of these areas. The group will also work to address specific governmental policy, investment and technology issues that have direct bearing on the energy industry.

In March 2014, Solvay SA, an international chemical group headquartered in Brussels, has completed the acquisition Plextronics Inc. to bolster its Organic Light Emitting Diodes (OLED) electronic display technology and launch a new development platform with a strong Asian foothold.  As part of its expansion into the rapidly growing OLED market, Solvay is setting up a new electronics laboratory at its research center at Ewha Woman’s University in Seoul City, South Korea.

See also 
 Conductive ink
 IMEC
 Multi-junction
 Poly(3-hexylthiophene) (P3HT) polymer

References

External links 
Official website of Plextronics, Inc.
IMEC to develop organic multi-junction solar cells for Plextronics

Organic electronics
Organic solar cells